Babak Rafati (born 28 May 1970) is an Iranian-German former football referee.

As of February 2010, he has officiated more than 150 matches in the Bundesliga and the 2. Bundesliga. As of November 2011, he has officiated 84 top-flight German league games.

Suicide attempt
Rafati was scheduled to referee a Bundesliga match on 19 November 2011 between 1. FC Köln and 1. FSV Mainz 05, but never arrived, leading to the match's abandonment after a replacement could not be found. He was later found in his hotel room, having attempted suicide, and was rushed into intensive care. He confirmed that he was suffering from depression, and that would like to return to refereeing after he finished undergoing therapy. Incidentally, his debut officiating a Bundesliga game was a match between Köln and Mainz 05 on 6 August 2005.

References

External links
 
 
 
 

1970 births
Living people
German people of Iranian descent
German football referees
Iranian football referees
UEFA Europa League referees